Sari diplomacy is the use of the sari by non-Asian women as a diplomatic uniform.

Cherie Blair was the first British First Lady to dress up in sarees and salwar suits on formal occasions.

Samantha Cameron, was also noted for her appearance at a Diwali event in London in silk saree which was described by Hello Magazine as "splendid".

References